Steffen Süßner (born 26 September 1977) is a German former professional football goalkeeper who works as goalkeeper coach at FSV Zwickau.

Career
Süßner started his senior career with Chemnitzer FC. After that, he played for German clubs Sachsen Leipzig and Erzgebirge Aue and Maltese club Floriana before retiring in 2009.

References

External links 
 Steffen Süßner: „Das konnte keiner ahnen“
 City stay cool to win thriller
 
 Die offizielle Homepage des Chemnitzer FC e.V. Profile

Living people
1977 births
German footballers
Association football goalkeepers
2. Bundesliga players
Chemnitzer FC players
FC Sachsen Leipzig players
FC Erzgebirge Aue players
Floriana F.C. players
German expatriate footballers
German expatriate sportspeople in Malta
Expatriate footballers in Malta